is a heliport in Tsukuba, Ibaraki, Japan. It is operated by Japan Airport Consultants Co., Ltd. under the management of the prefectural government.

History
The survey was started in 1988 as the first step to improve the empty public transportation infrastructure in Ibaraki Prefecture, and the construction of the Tsukuba Heliport was started in 1990. It was opened on July 23, 1991. The construction cost at the time of opening the port is about 780 million yen. At the time of formulating the opening plan, heliport construction was formulated together with the Mito area, but due to problems such as securing land, Tsukuba City was prioritized, and as a result, the Mito area was included in the Hyakuri Airfield Private Sharing Plan.

Facilities
Tsukuba Heliport is the first heliport in Ibaraki Prefecture for public use on the northeastern border of Tsukuba, and is located to connect the flight time to Tokyo in about 20 minutes. In addition to administrative applications such as disaster prevention and police, personnel transportation of private operators, aerial photography, pesticide spraying bases, training machines from nearby heliports such as Moriya and Shimotsuma and news helicopters. It is used as a landing site for helicopters for repairing antenna bases. Operating hours are from 7:00 am to 7:00 pm. However, takeoff and landing are not possible after sunset.

In addition, a terminal building with a pilot rest facility and a passenger waiting area, and a hangar for four helicopters is also installed on the same site.

References

Heliports in Japan
Transport in Ibaraki Prefecture